The 11th Canadian Parliament was in session from January 20, 1909, until July 29, 1911.  The membership was set by the 1908 federal election on October 26, 1908, and it changed only somewhat due to resignations and by-elections until it was dissolved prior to the 1911 election.

It was controlled by a Liberal Party majority under Prime Minister Sir Wilfrid Laurier and the 8th Canadian Ministry.  The Official Opposition was the Conservative/Liberal-Conservative, led by Robert Borden.

The Speaker was Charles Marcil.  See also List of Canadian electoral districts 1907-1914 for a list of the ridings in this parliament.

Alberta

British Columbia

Manitoba

New Brunswick

Nova Scotia

Ontario

Prince Edward Island

Quebec

Saskatchewan

Yukon

By-elections

References

Succession

 
Canadian parliaments
1909 establishments in Canada
1911 disestablishments in Canada
1909 in Canada
1910 in Canada
1911 in Canada